Evelyn Varden (born Mae Evelyn Hall; June 12, 1893  – July 11, 1958) was an American character actress.

Stage 
Born in Adair, Oklahoma, Varden was Cherokee and is listed on the Dawes Rolls as 1/32nd Cherokee by Blood. She began her career as a teenager in the first decade of the 20th century, acting with her aunts in a troupe that toured the western United States. She was on Broadway by age sixteen in 1910.  It was not until the 1930s and into her forties that her stage career took off in the theater, notably playing Mrs. Gibbs, the small town matron who dreams of Paris, in the original production of Our Town.

Varden's stage work mainly consisted of showy supporting roles although she did star in the ill-fated Return Engagement by Lawrence Riley. The 1950 melodrama Hilda Crane was a personal success for Varden although the play itself ran only two months. The following year she played the Nurse in a production of Romeo and Juliet starring Olivia de Havilland. Her final Broadway appearance in The Bad Seed was one of her acclaimed performances.

Radio and television 
Varden occasionally appeared on radio from the early 1940s and well into the 1950s. She starred in radio productions of Hay Fever, The Silver Cord, and The Glass Menagerie among several other programs. She would later appear in a number of television productions during the 1950s, including an adaptation of Cradle Song, opposite Judith Anderson.

Film 
Varden did not make her first film appearance until 1949 at age 56 with the film Pinky. She then went on to make over a dozen more films, including recreating her stage roles in the motion picture adaptations of Hilda Crane (1956) and The Bad Seed (1956).

Varden's best-known motion picture performance was as the gregarious storekeeper Icey Spoon in the 1955 film classic, The Night of the Hunter,  based on the like-named novel. That performance garnered considerable acclaim, not least from the book's author, Davis Grubb. "Varden is almost my favorite person in the whole film. [...] I thought she was perfect as Icey Spoon. She put things into that characterization that she should have gotten extra for. [...] Because she got across the very subtle way of middle-aged women who are promoting the marriage of a younger woman to an attractive male, they themselves are very sexually excited by the whole thing. It's a sixty-year-old yenta's way of getting off. She did more with a little sigh..."

Varden's career was still going strong at the time of her death. Immediately prior to taking ill in January, Varden was appearing in London, earning kudos for her portrayal of an American mother in Lesley Storm's comedy, Roar Like a Dove. Just weeks before her death, that turn earned Varden the award for Best Supporting Performance (in a Play or Musical) for 1957/1958, as judged by drama critics of the National British press.

Personal life 
Varden was married twice: first to fellow thespian Charles Pearce Coleman, from 1914 until their divorce in 1921, and then, from 1921 until her death, to Baltimore-based hotel operator William J. Quinn.

Death 
Varden died on July 11, 1958 at 65 in Flower Fifth Avenue Hospital in Manhattan.

Filmography

 Pinky (1949) as Melba Wooley
 When Willie Comes Marching Home (1950) as Mrs. Gertrude Kluggs
 Cheaper by the Dozen (1950) as School Principal (uncredited)
 Stella (1950) as Flora Stella's mother
 Elopement (1951) as Millie Reagan
 Finders Keepers (1952) as Ma Kipps
 Phone Call from a Stranger (1952) as Sally Carr
 The Student Prince (1954) as Queen
 Athena (1954) as Grandma Salome Mulvain
 Désirée (1954) as Marie
 The Night of the Hunter (1955) as Icey Spoon
 Hilda Crane (1956) as Mrs. Burns
 Cradle Song (1956, TV Movie) as The Vicaress
 The Bad Seed (1956) as Monica Breedlove
 Ten Thousand Bedrooms (1957) as Countess Alzani (final film role)

Broadway Appearances

 The Nest Egg (Nov 22, 1910 - Jan 1911)
 Seven Days' Leave (Jan 17, 1918 - Jun 1918)
 Allegiance (Aug 1, 1918 - Sep 1918)
 The Honor of the Family (Mar 17, 1919 - May 1919)
 Alley Cat (Sep 17, 1934 - Sep 1934)
 A Woman of the Soil (Mar 25, 1935 - Apr 1935)
 Life's Too Short (Sep 20, 1935 - Sep 1935)
 Weep for the Virgins (Nov 30, 1935 - Dec 1935)
 Russet Mantle (Jan 16, 1936 - Apr 1936)
 Prelude to Exile (Nov 30, 1936 - Jan 1937)
 Now You've Done It (Mar 5, 1937 - Apr 1937)
 To Quito and Back (Oct 6, 1937 - Dec 1937)
 Our Town (Feb 4, 1938 - Nov 19, 1938)
 Family Portrait (Mar 8, 1939 - Jun 1939)
 Ladies and Gentlemen (Oct 17, 1939 - Jan 13, 1940)
 Grey Farm (May 3, 1940 - Jun 1, 1940)
  Return Engagement (Nov 1, 1940 - Nov 7, 1940)
 The Lady Who Came to Stay (Jan 2, 1941 - Jan 4, 1941)
 Candle in the Wind (Oct 22, 1941 - Jan 10, 1942)
 The Family (Mar 30, 1943 - Apr 3, 1943)
 Our Town (revival)  (Jan 10, 1944 - Jan 29, 1944)
 Dream Girl (Dec 14, 1945 - Dec 14, 1946)
 Present Laughter (Oct 29, 1946 - Mar 15, 1947)
 She Stoops to Conquer (Dec 28, 1949 - Jan 8, 1950)
 Hilda Crane (Nov 1, 1950 - Dec 31, 1950)
 Romeo and Juliet (Mar 10, 1951 - Apr 21, 1951)
 A Date With April (Apr 15, 1953 - Apr 25, 1953)
 The Bad Seed (Dec 8, 1954 - Sep 27, 1955)

References

Further reading
 "Evelyn Varden, the Beautiful Spy in 'Seven Days' Leave,' the New Bill at The Park, New York". The Spur. The Spur. February 1, 1918.
 "Around Broadway's Maypole: Evelyn Varden. Theatre Magazine. May 1919.
 "The Stage: Evelyn Varden, Leading Woman with Otis Skinner in his Revival of 'The Honor of the Family'". Munsey's Magazine. June 1919.
 "L.A. Girl Will Be Seen in New Role: Evelyn Arden to Appear in Musical Comedy". Los Angeles Herald. June 3, 1920. 
 "Denied Many a Role Because She Was Willowy; Evelyn Varden, Lean in Plump Era, Now Proud of Her Curls". The Boston Sunday Globe. December 13, 1942.
 Ormsbee, Helen (November 10, 1946) "Dolly Varden Once, Evelyn Varden Now: Evelyn Varden in "Present Laughter"". New York Herald Tribune.
 Marriott, J. B. (October 17, 1957). "Evelyn Varden: A Distinguished Visitor from America". The Stage.

External links
 
 
 
 
1947 radio production of Hay Fever at Internet Archive

1893 births
1958 deaths
20th-century American actresses
20th-century Native Americans
20th-century Native American women
Actresses from Oklahoma
American film actresses
American radio actresses
American stage actresses
American television actresses
Cherokee Nation artists
Cherokee Nation people (1794–1907)
People from Adair, Oklahoma